Parvez Qadir is a British actor from Rochdale.

He appeared as Jaz in all three series of the BBC television series The Cops and has also appeared in Coronation Street and in the Mike Leigh film All or Nothing.  In 2008, he appeared in Spooks: Code 9.

Credits

Television

Film

Theatre

Radio

References

External links 

CV on agent's website 

Living people
British male television actors
British people of Punjabi descent
British male film actors
Year of birth missing (living people)